Spiral Castle is the twelfth album by American heavy metal band Manilla Road, released in 2002 by Iron Glory Records.

Track listing 
 "Gateway to the Sphere" – 2:30
 "Spiral Castle" – 8:26
 "Shadow" – 4:24
 "Seven Trumpets" – 5:19
 "Merchants of Death" – 10:53
 "Born Upon the Soul" – 7:17
 "Sands of Time" – 7:40

Credits 
 Mark Shelton – guitars, vocals
 Scott Peters – drums, percussion, vocals
 Bryan Patrick – vocals
 Mark Anderson – bass
 Momadon – violin on "Sands of Time"

Manilla Road albums
2002 albums